Viviana Chávez (born 28 May 1987) is an Argentinean marathon runner. She finished 125th at the 2016 Olympics. She took up long-distance running in 2010.

References

External links

 

1987 births
Living people
Argentine female long-distance runners
Argentine female marathon runners
Athletes (track and field) at the 2016 Summer Olympics
Olympic athletes of Argentina
People from San Juan, Argentina
Sportspeople from San Juan Province, Argentina